The Washington Power were a member of the National Lacrosse League during the 2001 and 2002 seasons. After the inaugural championship in 1987 in Baltimore (as the Thunder) through 1999 and an unsuccessful stint in Pittsburgh (as the CrosseFire), the franchise moved to Washington, D.C. in 2001, with a new ownership structure led by Steve Comiskey, a DC attorney to high-tech billionaires, and star player Gary Gait.  After two seasons of low attendance in Washington, the franchise moved again, this time to Denver, Colorado, as the Colorado Mammoth. In Colorado they have seen success both on and off the field, culminating in 2006, when they had the highest attendance in the league, and also won the Champion's Cup.

Awards & honors

All-time record

Playoff results

References

Defunct National Lacrosse League teams
Sports in Washington, D.C.
Lacrosse clubs established in 2001
Lacrosse clubs disestablished in 2002